The Legend of Boggy Creek is a 1972 American docudrama horror film about the "Fouke Monster", a Bigfoot-type creature that reportedly has been seen in and around Fouke, Arkansas since the 1940s. The film mixes staged interviews with some local residents who claim to have encountered the creature, along with reenactments of encounters. The film's director and producer, Charles B. Pierce, was an advertising salesman who convinced a local trucking company to invest in the film and hired locals (mainly high school students) to help complete it. The film was made on a $160,000 budget and was released theatrically on August 8, 1972.

After Pierce's daughter Pamula Pierce Barcelou acquired the rights to The Legend of Boggy Creek, a remastered version of the film premiered in 2019.

Plot
The film claims to be a true story, detailing the existence of the "Fouke Monster", a seven-foot-tall Bigfoot-like creature that has reportedly been seen by residents of a small Arkansas community since the 1940s. It is described as being completely covered in reddish-brown hair, leaving three-toed tracks and having a foul odor.

Several locals from the small town of Fouke, Arkansas recall their stories, claiming that the creature has killed many large animals over the years. One farmer claims that the beast carried off two of his 100 lb. hogs with little effort, leaping a fence with the animals tucked under its arm. In one scene, a kitten is shown as having been "scared to death" by the creature. The narrator informs the audience that, while people have shot at the creature in the past, it has always managed to escape. In another sequence, hunters attempt to pursue the creature with dogs, but the dogs refuse to give chase. A police constable states that while driving home one night, the creature suddenly ran across the road in front of his car.

In a later sequence, culled from the actual newspaper accounts inspiring the film, the creature is shown menacing a family in a remote country house. After being fired upon, the creature attacks, sending one family member to the hospital.

The creature was never captured and is said to still stalk the swamps of southern Arkansas to this day.

Cast

Production

The Legend of Boggy Creek was filmed in Fouke, Arkansas, Shreveport, Louisiana and Texarkana, Texas.

Releases

Initial release
The Legend of Boggy Creek was released theatrically in 1972. Pierce's daughter Amanda Squitiero claims to have autobiographical notes made by her father indicating that the film ultimately made $25 million ($166 million in 2021 dollars), but this cannot be verified.

According to Variety, the film earned another $4.8 million in 1975 theatrical rentals in North America.

Return to Boggy Creek and Boggy Creek II: And the Legend Continues, were released to theaters later in 1977 and 1985, respectively. Neither of the unauthorized sequels were as successful as the original film.

Home media

The Legend of Boggy Creek has had several unauthorized bootleg releases both on VHS and DVD. Between 2002 and 2011, Hen's Tooth Video, Education 2000 Inc., Sterling Entertainment, Unicorn Video, RHR Home Video, Cheezy Flicks Entertainment, and Film Trauma, all released unauthorized copies of The Legend of Boggy Creek on Region 1 DVD. The DVD versions have been notoriously low quality, most of them seemingly taken from VHS editions, and all of them were 'Pan and Scan' transfers, rather than the movie's proper widescreen Techniscope presentation. For years, The Legend of Boggy Creek was thought to be in the public domain and all VHS/DVD releases unofficial. However, Pamula Pierce Barcelou, daughter of director Charles B. Pierce, gained control of the movie in 2018, when Steve Ledwell, of Ledwell & Son, assigned her copyright of both The Legend of Boggy Creek and another Pierce film, Bootleggers. Mr Ledwell's father, L.W., helped finance The Legend of Boggy Creek, which found also success as a low-budget, drive-in creature feature.

The Legend of Boggy Creek can be found on DVD and Blu-ray. This modern format was made from the 4K restoration of the original camera negative in January 2020, which restored the film's original widescreen, Techniscope film aspect ratio (2.35 : 1), color, and soundtrack.

Ahead of the home release, the restored print received its theatrical premier at the historic Perot Theater, Texarkana, TX on June 14, 2019 with additional screenings at select theaters nationwide.

2019 re-release
The Legend of Boggy Creek was restored/remastered at the George Eastman Museum, Rochester, New York, & Audio Mechanics, Burbank, California, using many of the original elements.

The film premiered at the historic Perot Theatre, Texarkana, Texas, on Friday, June 14, 2019. Additional showings began at midnight, June 15, and continued through Sunday, June 16 (Charles B. Pierce Day in Texarkana, Arkansas and Texarkana, Texas).

The next screening took place in Phoenixville, Pennsylvania, on Friday, July 5 at the Colonial Theatre. Additional screenings followed at select theaters nationwide.

Reception

The Legend of Boggy Creek received generally favorable reviews upon its initial release.

"... Scene after scene of almost pristine wilderness is a visual feast ... its sheer honest ... rigid adherence to authenticity ...  is highly persuasive that there is indeed, a “Fouke Monster.” It's scary and charming ..." Arkansas Gazette, Little Rock

"... visually stunning and exciting ... Pierce manages to create a sense of foreboding that brings audiences up sharply ..." Goff, Daily Variety.

"... the film captures the eerie beauty of Arkansas’ primeval swamps and contains images of Southern American backwoods life unmatched in its rich rustic flavor since Robert Flaherty's Louisiana Story ... Pierce's photography accents the Arkansas swampland's incredible beauty and unsettling mystery ... an unusual blend of malevolence and melancholia ... eminently successful in giving the imagination a good healthy jolt and in ultimately celebrating the unfathomable mysteries of nature ..." Glenn Lovell, Hollywood Reporter.

Legacy 
Writer and director Daniel Myrick cited The Legend of Boggy Creek as an influence on his 1999 film The Blair Witch Project.

Unofficial sequels
In 1977, Return to Boggy Creek was released. It was directed by Tom Moore. Charles B. Pierce was not involved with the film's production, and the film carries over none of the original's docudrama elements. It stars Dawn Wells and Dana Plato. Wells portrays the mother of three children who become lost in the swamp until the creature comes to their rescue.

In 2010, another unauthorized sequel with no narrative connection to the original (or its 1985 sequel) was released as a straight-to-DVD movie, titled Boggy Creek. It concerns a Bigfoot-like creature who attacks a group of teenagers that are vacationing in the fictional area of Boggy Creek, Texas. The film was written and directed by Brian T. Jaynes. It was originally produced in 2010 and released on September 13, 2011.

Official sequel
In 1985 Boggy Creek II: And the Legend Continues was released. Pierce returned to direct this film which was written as a direct sequel to the original film, thus the reason for styling the title as "II" instead of "III". It follows the adventures of a University of Arkansas professor (Pierce) and his students, one of which is Pierce's son, on their trip to Fouke, Arkansas, to find and study the creature. A few scenes in the beginning of the movie were shot at the university, including an Arkansas Razorbacks football game. The movie was featured in an episode of Mystery Science Theater 3000. The "Big Creature" in the film was portrayed by James Faubus Griffith, a Hollywood stuntman, actor and bodyguard.

See also
 Creature from Black Lake, 1976 film

References

External links 
 
 
 
 

1972 films
1972 documentary films
1972 horror films
American documentary films
American independent films
American monster movies
American natural horror films
Bigfoot films
American docudrama films
1970s English-language films
American exploitation films
Films directed by Charles B. Pierce
Films set in Arkansas
Films shot in Arkansas
Films about cryptids
Southern Gothic films
1970s American films